Llangybi can refer to one of several villages named after Saint Cybi, their reputed founder.

In Wales

Llangybi, Ceredigion
Llangybi, Gwynedd
Llangybi, Monmouthshire